Claudio Benjamín Orrego Larraín (born December 20, 1966) is a Chilean lawyer, Christian Democrat politician, and the governor of the Santiago Metropolitan Region since July 14, 2021.

Orrego is a former minister of President Ricardo Lagos and the former mayor of the commune of Peñalolén. In 2013, he was a candidate for the presidency of Chile, but lost the primary election to Michelle Bachelet, and other candidates. On March 11, 2014 he was appointed intendant of the Santiago Metropolitan Region by President Bachelet. On June 13, 2021, he was elected governor of the Santiago Metropolitan Region, in a newly created position.

References

External links

 Official campaign website 

1966 births
Living people
Politicians from Santiago
Christian Democratic Party (Chile) politicians
Saint George's College, Santiago alumni
Pontifical Catholic University of Chile alumni
Government ministers of Chile
Intendants of Santiago Metropolitan Region
Mayors of places in Chile
Presidents of the Pontifical Catholic University of Chile Student Federation
Harvard Kennedy School alumni
Chilean people of Basque descent
Candidates for President of Chile
20th-century Chilean lawyers
Orrego